Evangelical Protestantism is one of five officially recognized faiths in Albania. It is a Christian faith that views Jesus Christ as its founder and head, and the Bible (especially the New Testament) as its written authority. Evangelical Protestants in Albania numbered approximately 8000 in 1998, and was around 13,000 to 15,000 in the early 2020s. The International Religious Freedom Report of 2007 reported 189 different Protestant associations and groups.  Unlike other official religions in Albania, Evangelical Protestants are not organized under a hierarchy with an official head, but operate autonomously in separate churches or organizations bearing different denominational or non-denominational names. Most, but not all Evangelical/Protestant groups are members of the Albania's Evangelical Brotherhood (VUSH), a cooperative organization which views itself as existing as "an instrument of blessing … with the purpose of promoting unity amongst the churches, representing every local church with dignity, and promoting evangelism."

History
On August 26, 1816, Robert Pinkerton wrote the British and Foreign and Bible Society to encourage them to translate the New Testament into Albanian. Cyrus Hamlin reported in 1857 that Albanians were applying to his Protestant seminary. The first documented Albanian Protestant was Kostandin Kristoforidhi, who left his native Orthodox faith and converted to Protestantism on his own while comparing Orthodox, Roman Catholic and Protestant theological texts. He joined the Protestant Church of Smyrna in 1856 or 1857, and was sent to Istanbul for theological training.

In Monastir, Gjerasim Qiriazi also converted to Protestantism ca. 1876–1877, and united with the multi-ethnic Protestant church there. The first two known Albanian Protestant-Evangelical churches were both established by Gjerasim Qiriazi, first in Monastir in 1884 and later in Korça in 1890 (both cities then part of the Ottoman Empire).

In April 1890, Gjerasim Qiriazi was ordained as the first Albanian evangelist and preacher by the American Board of Commissioners for Foreign Missions in the board's annual meeting help in Monastir. The second church among Albanians was opened in Korça. Qiriazi was also the head of one of the first national societies within Albania, named “The Evangelical Brotherhood”. As a result, Gjerasim Qiriazi is considered as the father of the Albanian Protestant Church.

See also
Religion in Albania
Christianity in Albania

References

Further reading 
Hosaflook, David. Lëvizja protestante te shqiptarët, 1816-1908. Skopje: ITSHKSH, 2019.
Young, David. Lëvizja protestante midis shqiptarëve, 1908-1991. Prishtina: TENDA, 2011.

External links 
  (dedicated to the study and research of Protestantism in Albania).